Hit It Rich! is a social network casino game developed by Zynga and available on Facebook.  Hit it Rich is a freemium game, meaning that it is free to play, but players have the option of purchasing extra features.

An iOS version of Hit it Rich was released and an additional version was launched on Google Play for Android devices. Players are able to carry progress from the web version of the game to mobile. The game is part of the larger Zynga Casino franchise, which was revealed in an October 2011 event called “Unleashed.” It was developed by Spooky Cool Labs, which Zynga acquired in June 2013, for the purpose of creating social casino games.

In February 2014, Hit it Rich was the most downloaded free game on the iPad's "casino" category.

Features and gameplay 
During the game, players experience a unique type of entertainment that blends the look and feel of Vegas-style video slot machines with commercial themes such as The Wizard of Oz, The Terminator, and others, including other Zynga products such as Farmville 2.

The game features numerous five-reel slots that vary by bet size and the number of betting lines available. Bonus rounds are activated when three “Bonus” symbols appear on valid lines, and extra coins are earned for outscoring friends.
As the game progresses, new levels are unlocked, with higher max bets. At the same time, players earn points in the game’s loyalty program. Every bet adds experience points to a bar located at the top of the screen. Once the bar is filled, the player advances to the next level. There are five levels ranging from Tin to Platinum. Tournament play, achievements lists, and a high-limit lobby add to the social experience. As with other Zynga games on Facebook, friends help one another achieve goals.

Hit it Rich is available in seven languages including: Dutch, English, French, German, Portuguese, Spanish, and Turkish.

Notes

External links 
 Zynga Hit It Rich!

2013 video games
Android (operating system) games
Facebook games
Free-to-play video games
Zynga
Casino video games
IOS games
Video games developed in the United States